Võru is a town and a municipality in south-eastern Estonia. It is the capital of Võru County and the centre of Võru Parish.

History
Võru was founded on 21 August 1784, according to the wish of the Empress Catherine II of Russia, by the order of Riga Governor general count George Browne, on the site of the former Võru estate.

Geography and climate
The town is situated on the shore of Lake Tamula.
Võru has a humid continental climate (Dfb according to the Köppen climate classification) with warm summers and cold winters. Precipitation is usually higher in early summer to late autumn, and lower in late winter to early spring.

Culture
The Võru Folklore Festival is held annually in Võru in July since 1995.

Friedrich Reinhold Kreutzwald, the author of the Estonian national epic "Kalevipoeg", lived in Võru from 1833 to 1877.

Religion

Sports
Võru is home to Võru Stadium, the home ground of II liiga football team Võru JK.

Transport
European route E263 is the main connection with the rest of Estonia. Other roads connect Võru with Põlva, Räpina, Antsla and Valga. The Valga–Pechory railway, which passes through Võru, is currently inactive. The Võru train station is unused as of 2014.

Military
Võru is home to Taara Army Base, headquarters of the Kuperjanov Infantry Battalion.

Twin towns – sister cities

Võru is twinned with:

 Alūksne, Latvia
 Bad Segeberg, Germany
 Chambray-lès-Tours, France
 Härryda, Sweden
 Iisalmi, Finland
 Joniškis, Lithuania
 Kaniv, Ukraine
 Laitila, Finland
 Landskrona, Sweden
 Pechorsky District, Russia
 Smolyan, Bulgaria
 Suwałki, Poland

Notable people
Priit Aimla (born 1941) writer, poet, humorist and politician was born in Võru. 
Helmut Ajango (1931–2013), Estonian-American architect, was born in Võru.
Moses Wolf Goldberg (1905–1964), Estonian-Jewish chemist, lived in Võru as a child.
Sulev Iva (born 1969), Võro identity advocate, founder of Võro Institute.
Meelis Kanep (born 1983), Estonian chess grandmaster, was born in Võru.
Friedrich Reinhold Kreutzwald (1803–1882), Estonian writer and folklorist, the author of Estonian national epic Kalevipoeg, lived in Võru from 1833 to 1877.
Ain Mäeots (born 1971), Estonian actor and director, was born in Võru. 
Innar Mäesalu (born 1970), Estonian politician
Marianne Mikko (born 1961), Estonian politician.
Hilje Murel (born 1975), Estonian actress, was born in Võru. 
Priit Narusk (born 1977), Estonian cross-country skier, was born in Võru.
Erki Nool (born 1970), Estonian decathlete and politician, was born in Võru.
Erki Pehk (born 1968), Estonian conductor, was born in Võru.
Anti Saarepuu (born 1983), Estonian cross-country skier, was born in Võru.
Leon Sibul (1932–2007), American electrical engineer, was born in Võru.
Uku Suviste (born 1982), Estonian singer, was born in Võru.
Kaija Udras (born 1986), Estonian cross-country skier, was born in Võru.
Debora Vaarandi (1916–2007), Estonian poet, was born in Võru. 
Katrin Välbe (1904–1981), Estonian actress, was born in Võru. 
Kullar Viimne (born 1980), Estonian fillmaker, was born in Võru.

Gallery

See also
Võro language

References

External links

 
Võru Folklore Festival
Võro Institute

 
Cities and towns in Estonia
Municipalities of Estonia
Planned cities
Populated places established in 1784
18th-century establishments in Estonia
Kreis Werro